XHEMM-FM is a radio station on 101.7 FM in Morelia, Michoacán. It is owned by Grupo ACIR and carries its Mix adult contemporary format.

History
XEMM-AM 870, a 500-watt daytimer received its concession on March 4, 1955. It was owned by José Martínez Ramírez and sold in the 1960s to Radio Promotora de Morelia, by which time it had moved to 960 kHz (XELY 1430 then moved to 870).

XEMM was cleared to move to FM in 2011.

References

Grupo ACIR
Radio stations in Michoacán